Samarium(III) hydroxide is an inorganic compound with chemical formula Sm(OH)3.

Chemical properties
Samarium(III) hydroxide can react with acid and produce samarium salts：
 Sm(OH)3 + 3 H+ → Sm3+ + 3 H2O
Samarium(III) hydroxide will decompose to SmO(OH) when heated; continued heating produces Sm2O3.

References

Samarium compounds
Hydroxides